Funeral Mariachi is the eleventh and final studio album by American experimental rock band Sun City Girls, released on September 28, 2010 by Abduction Records. It comprises recording sessions created in the months prior to the passing of founding member Charles Gocher, who died of cancer on February 19, 2007. The music has been described as the trio's most relaxed and easily accessible.

Release and reception 

The album was released to considerable critical acclaim and receiving high marks from established critics such as Robert Christgau, Spin and Pitchfork Media.

Track listing

Personnel
Adapted from the Funeral Mariachi liner notes.

Sun City Girls
 Alan Bishop – bass guitar, electric guitar, acoustic guitar, mandolin, pipe, organ, mellotron, percussion, effects, vocals, production, mixing, recording (2, 3, 6, 9, 11), design
 Richard Bishop – electric guitar, acoustic guitar, bass guitar, piano, organ, vocals
 Charles Gocher – drums, gamelan, gong, percussion
Additional musicians
 Dave Carter – trumpet (11)
 Eyvind Kang – viola (7, 9)
 Jessika Kenney – vocals (3, 5, 9)

Production and additional personnel
 Ed Brooks – mastering
 Scott Colburn – recording, mixing
 Randall Dunn – recording (4, 5)
 Jesse Paul Miller – design
 Sun City Girls – musical arrangements
 Kim Wauters – cover art

Release history

References

External links 
 

2010 albums
Sun City Girls albums